Marcel Jacob "Mike" DeLotto (July 17, 1912 – October 30, 1983) was an American football coach. He was the first head coach for the Long Beach State 49ers football program. He coached from 1955 to 1957 and compiled a record of 13–10.

DeLotto died of cancer in 1983.

Head coaching record

References

1912 births
1983 deaths
American football fullbacks
Long Beach State 49ers football coaches
Randolph–Macon Yellow Jackets football players
Sportspeople from Clifton, New Jersey
Deaths from cancer in California